The 2012–13 season is a season in Belgian Pro League played by R.S.C. Anderlecht, a Belgian football club based in Anderlecht, Brussels. The season covers the period from 1 July 2012 to 30 June 2013.

Match results
League positions are sourced from Statto, while the remaining contents of each table are sourced from the references in the "Ref" column.

Regular season

League table

Belgian Pro League

Championship playoff

Playoff table

Belgian Super Cup

Belgian Cup

UEFA Champions League

Player details

Numbers in parentheses denote appearances as substitute.
Players with names struck through and marked  left the club during the playing season.
Players with names in italics and marked * were on loan from another club with Anderlecht.
Key to positions: GK – Goalkeeper; DF – Defender; MF – Midfielder; FW – Forward

References

R.S.C. Anderlecht seasons
Anderlecht
Anderlecht
Belgian football championship-winning seasons